Asian Highway 84 (AH84) is a road in the Asian Highway Network running 1074 km (667 miles) from Doğubeyazıt to Mersin, Turkey. The route is concurrent with European route E90 and European route E99. The route is as follows:

Turkey
 Road D975: Doğubeyazıt - Muradiye
 Road D280: Muradiye - Erciş
 Road D290: Erciş - Adilcevaz
 Road D965: Adilcevaz - Baykan
 Road D360: Baykan - Diyarbakır - Siverek
 Road D885: Siverek - Şanlıurfa
 Otoyol 52: Şanlıurfa - Gaziantep - Toprakkale - Adana
Branch  Otoyol 53: Toprakkale - Iskenderun
 Otoyol 50: Adana
 Otoyol 51: Adana - Mersin

Asian Highway Network

Roads in Turkey